Beatty Run is a  long 2nd order tributary to Sugar Creek in Venango County, Pennsylvania.

Course
Beatty Run rises on the Deckard Run divide about 1 mile east of Deckard, Pennsylvania in Venango County.  Beatty Run then flows southeast to meet Sugar Creek about 1 mile north of Wyattville, Pennsylvania in Venango County.

Watershed
Beatty Run drains  of area, receives about 44.3 in/year of precipitation, has a topographic wetness index of 418.12, and has an average water temperature of 7.93 °C.  The watershed is 71% forested.

See also 
 List of rivers of Pennsylvania
 List of tributaries of the Allegheny River

References

Additional Images

Rivers of Venango County, Pennsylvania
Rivers of Pennsylvania
Tributaries of the Allegheny River